AM/PM is the only studio album by American punk rock band The White Noise. The album was released on June 23, 2017, through Fearless Records and produced by Drew Fulk. In May 2017, the ensemble released a music video for "Bite Marks", the first single from their album. The album takes its name from the song of the same name by Give up the Ghost from their 2001 LP Background Music.

Music
AM/PM features musical styles ranging from emo, pop punk and radio rock to alternative metal, metalcore, post-hardcore, punk rock, hardcore punk industrial punk, ambient hardcore and melodic hardcore; songs such as "I Lost My Mind (In California)" have been described as a 90s-inspired pop punk curveball compared to the metalcore of "Picture Day", alternative metal of "Bite Marks", and ferocious hardcore punk of "All The Best Songs are Dead" and "Rated R..."; leading to the album being compared to the styles of Beartooth, Bring Me the Horizon and Comeback Kid. Rock Sound hailed the album being non-nonsensical and far from boring.

Track listing

Personnel
Credits taken from the Fearless Records website.

The White Noise
Shawn Walker – unclean vocals, clean vocals
David Southern – clean vocals, bass
Josh "KJ" Strock – lead guitar
Bailey Crego – rhythm guitar
Tommy West – drums

Production
Drew Fulk – mixing, production, writing
 Jeff Dunne – engineering, mixing
 Chris Athens – mastering

References

The White Noise albums
2017 debut albums
Fearless Records albums
Melodic hardcore albums